NGC 1869 (also known as ESO 85-SC55) is an open cluster in the Dorado constellation. It is located within the Large Magellanic Cloud. It was discovered by James Dunlop on September 24, 1826, using a telescope reflector with a nine-inch aperture. It is a large cluster of rich scattered stars. It is part of a triple association with NGC 1871 and NGC 1873. It has an apparent magnitude of 14.0.

References

Dorado (constellation)
ESO objects
1869
Open clusters
Astronomical objects discovered in 1826
Large Magellanic Cloud